Humberston is a village and civil parish south of Cleethorpes in North East Lincolnshire, England.

Boundary and population
The village's boundary with Cleethorpes runs along North Sea Lane and Humberston Road. Its population in the 2001 census was 5,384, increasing to 5,634 at the 2011 Census. The Prime Meridian runs east of Humberston, through the Thorpe Park caravan site.

History
The Danes landed at the site of the village in 870. Humberston (or Humberstone, as the village was first known) takes its name from a large boulder, the "Humber Stone", which was deposited on the site of the former Midfield Farm during the last Ice Age. The boulder may be seen at the entrance to the village library, near St Peter's Church. The boulder at the entrance to the former library was discovered in the winter of 1956/7 while deep ploughing was taking place on the big field at Midfield Farm. two years later it was moved to Wendover Paddock in the village, and when the new library was built it was moved there. There is no evidence whatsoever that this is the actual stone from which the village gets its name, but it was described by Professor H H Swinnerton and Sir William Pugh of Hull University as a glacial boulder of Scottish origin of the type from which the village may have got its name. The "e" at the end of the name was later dropped to avoid confusion with a place with the same name.

The oldest (and tallest) building in Humberston is St Peter's Church. Although the church was rebuilt about 1710, the tower is over seven hundred years old.
At the rear of the church is the site of the former Humberston Abbey of Benedictine monks, which was founded during the reign of Henry II and dedicated to Saints Mary and Peter. Although nearly all that remains is the monks' mound in the manor-house garden, stone sarcophagi have been excavated. The Wesleyan Methodists built a small chapel on Humberston Avenue in 1835, and a larger replacement chapel was built in 1907. An early wireless station was built in 1910.

Education, sports and government
A comprehensive school, Humberston Academy (formerly known as the Humberston School and the Humberston Maths and Computing College) is located on Humberston Avenue. Next to the academy is one of the village's primary schools, Humberston Cloverfields Primary School. The Village has at least two football teams based out of it, The Coach House and Fosse Water Treatment FC. Both teams play in the Grimsby, Cleethorpes and District Sunday League. Due to a lack of local facilities both teams regularly play in nearby Bradley Village.  A now extinct team Humberston FC used to also play in the Grimsby, Cleethorpes and District Sunday League.

Council members
North East Lincolnshire Council has one electoral ward within Humberston which is Humberston and New Waltham. All of the councillors for the ward currently are Conservatives.

Humberston and New Waltham Ward representatives are:
 Cllr Stan Shreeve
 Cllr John Fenty
 Cllr Stephen Harness

Governance
Humberston is part of the Cleethorpes parliamentary constituency, and has been represented by Martin Vickers of the Conservative Party since 2010.

The total population of this  ward at the 2011 census was 10,848.

Places of interest
A man-made lake off North Sea Lane is in the centre of Cleethorpes Country Park. The park has picnic benches, fishing jetties and dog-swimming and wildlife areas. It is home to Canada geese and other wild birds.

The Humberston Fitties conservation area, known as Fitties Field during the late 1940s and early 1950s, is in the village. Also in Humberston is Thorpe Park, a Haven Holidays caravan park.

Gallery

References

External links

 Humberston Happening
 Article about building in the Fittes conservation area

Civil parishes in Lincolnshire
Borough of North East Lincolnshire
Villages in Lincolnshire
Populated coastal places in Lincolnshire